Keith Carter is a Liverpool-based comedian, writer, and actor, best known for his comic creation Nige, a caricature of a scallie from Merseyside cited by Sir Jeremy Isaacs as being instrumental in helping Liverpool's successful 2007 Capital of Culture bid.

Carter has been described as "not just a stand-up with a dressing-up box, he makes his characters live by his bearing, his gestures and by his voice".

Career
Carter began his career as a comedian in clubs in Liverpool in 2001. He has developed a number of comic characters, the most famous of which is Nige, who he claims to have based on a scouser queuing up in front of him in a dole queue; other characters Carter has created include Gerald Roberts, an opinionated driver, and Colin Kilkelly, who thinks he is Liverpool's answer to Enrique Iglesias.
Carter has made a number of appearances at the Edinburgh Fringe Festival and has been nominee and winner of a number of awards. His appearance in Under the Mud was described by The Guardian as an almost show stealing performance. In 2008 he co-wrote the play The Berserker Boys with fellow Liverpudlian comedian Stanley McHale. The play premièred at the Unity Theatre in February 2008.

TV Credits
Domestic, BBC 2 (2002)

Comedy Shuffle, BBC 3 (written and performed) (2007)

It's Adam and Shelley, BBC 3 (2007)

Meet The Blogs, ITV (2008)

Scallywagga, BBC 3 (2008)

Tonightly, Channel 4 (2008)

Radio Credits
Loose Ends, BBC Radio (2004)

The Gerald Roberts Radio Show, BBC Radio (2005)

How I Won The Capital of Culture by Nige, BBC Radio (2005)

Deck of Friends, BBC Radio (playwright) (2005)

Film Credits
Under the Mud (2007).

Awards and nominations
2008 Daily Post Arts Award
2003 Liverpool Echo Comedian of the Year
2005 North West Breakthrough Comedian of the Year
2001 BBC New Comedy Awards, finalist

References

External links
  Keith Carter profile at the Comedy Zone
  BBC profile of Keith Carter
  Keith Carter's blog for the Liverpool Echo

Living people
English male comedians
Musicians from Liverpool
Male actors from Liverpool
Comedians from Liverpool
1969 births